The Harris House is a historic house in rural southeastern Pulaski County, Arkansas. Built in 1856, it is one of the oldest houses in central Arkansas. It is a modest -story wood-frame structure, built out of local hand-hewn cypress and handmade bricks. It has an open porch extending across a five-bay front facade, with gable dormers projecting from the roof above. The entrance is flanked by sidelight windows and topped by a transom. The house was built on land acquired by Robert Harris in 1853, part of which was granted by President John Quincy Adams. The land was still in the hands of Harris' descendants in 1976, when it was listed on the National Register of Historic Places.

See also
National Register of Historic Places listings in Pulaski County, Arkansas

References

Houses on the National Register of Historic Places in Arkansas
Houses completed in 1856
Houses in Pulaski County, Arkansas
National Register of Historic Places in Pulaski County, Arkansas